Bucharest Daily News was an English-language newspaper operating out of the Romanian capital city, Bucharest, and was frequently cited as a source by the sudden influx of Romanian news articles on Wikinews.
It covered world and local news, politics, business, arts and leisure, sports and feature stories. In early 2006, the publication received much attention for a series on the effects of an EU-imposed ban on international adoptions from Romania. The articles called  attention to the poor conditions in Romanian orphanages and children's hospitals while the ban was being lauded by former European Parliament Rapporteur for Romania, Baroness Emma Nicholson.

The Daily News staff was given their usual summer holiday in August 2006. While the paper's website was published and updated for another few months, the printing of the paper stopped. The newspaper and its website were eventually shut down and have not been restarted.

External links

 Bucharest Daily News (Archive)

English-language newspapers published in Romania
Newspapers published in Bucharest
Defunct newspapers published in Romania